The Giornate degli Autori or simply the Giornate, formerly also known in English as Venice Days, is an independent film festival section held in parallel to and in association with the Venice Film Festival. It is modeled on the Directors' Fortnight at the Cannes Film Festival. Anac and 100autori are engaged to support and promote the Giornate. It was founded in 2004 by Giorgio Gosetti.

The Giornate' goal, similarly to that of the Directors' Fortnight's, is to balance the star studded main event more sensational approach with drawing attention to high quality authors' cinema, specifically the one that represents innovative, original and independent take on moviemaking. With Villa Degli Autori as its center hub and headquarters during the event the Giornate's ambition is also to create an "informal and free space for authors, producers, distributors and journalists to meet and discuss their ideas".

The program usually includes 11 competition films and the closing-night film which all, in addition to special screenings and additional events, are screened at Venice Film Festival theaters and venues.

The Giornate started in 2004 with zero budget, three months to organize and, as director and founder Giorgio Gosetti put it, one common goal: "to go well beyond the simple showcase of films in the official selection and offer a bright window to the work of directors."

The president of the Giornate is Andrea Purgatori. Honorary President is Roberto Barzanti.

Awards 
 Giornate degli Autori Award
 BNL People's Choice Award for the Official Selection's films
 Label Europa Cinemas
 Luigi De Laurentiis Award Lion of the Future

References 

Venice Film Festival